Shardul Pandit (born 28 November 1985) is an Indian cricketer, singer, and radio jockey. He was a participant in the reality TV show Bigg Boss 14

Career
Shardul Pandit did MBA in Advertising and Public Relations from the International Institute of Professional Studies (IIPS) Indore.
He is the winner of Zee India's Best Cinestars Ki Khoj from Indore region. He started his career as a Radio Jockey with Radio Mirchi. He got into the Limca Book of Records by performing non-stop for 19 hours on the radio. After earning recognition in the radio world, he made his acting debut with NDTV Imagine's popular serial ‘Bandini’ starring Ronit Roy and Aasiya Kazi in the lead roles.
 After that he appeared in Kitani Mohabbat Hai (season 2) and Godh Bharaai. In 2012, he shifted to Dubai to work as an RJ for Radio Mirchi International. However, he returned to Mumbai in 2015 and started working as a VJ for 9XM. Shardul Pandit was also the commentator for Box Cricket League (BCL). In 2017, he got the lead role in the &TV popular Show Kuldeepak opposite Keerti Nagpure. His role and pairing with the leading lady Keerti Nagpure was greatly appreciated by the viewers.

Television

References

External links
 

Indian male television actors
Living people
Male actors from Indore
Male actors in Hindi television
21st-century Indian male actors
1985 births
Bigg Boss (Hindi TV series) contestants